The Mont Charvet (2,538 m) is a mountain in the Aravis Range in Savoie, France.

Mountains of the Alps
Charvet